Samea is a genus of moths of the family Crambidae described by Achille Guenée in 1854.

Species
Samea alophalis Hampson, 1912
Samea antisema (Meyrick, 1886)
Samea atrichonalis Amsel, 1956
Samea baccatalis (Hulst, 1892)
Samea bipunctalis Warren, 1888
Samea borboraula (Meyrick, 1936)
Samea calligraphalis (Snellen, 1892)
Samea calonalis Walker, 1859
Samea carettalis Schaus, 1940
Samea castoralis (Walker, 1859)
Samea choristalis Hampson, 1912
Samea conjunctalis Möschler, 1890
Samea delicata Kaye, 1923
Samea druchachalis Dyar, 1924
Samea ecclesialis Guenée, 1854
Samea figuralis Walker in Chapman, 1969
Samea forsteri (Amsel, 1956)
Samea mictalis Hampson, 1912
Samea multiplicalis (Guenée, 1854)
Samea obliteralis Walker, 1866
Samea purpurascens Moore, 1877
Samea similalis Hampson, 1912
Samea sylvialis (Walker, 1859)

Former species
Samea fumidalis Leech, 1889
Samea nicaeusalis (Walker, 1859)

References

Spilomelinae
Crambidae genera
Taxa named by Achille Guenée